The 2010–11 San Antonio Spurs season was the 44th season of the franchise, 38th in San Antonio and 35th in the National Basketball Association (NBA).

In the playoffs, the Spurs lost to the eighth-seeded Memphis Grizzlies in six games in the First Round, becoming the fourth number one seed in league history to lose a playoffs series against a number eight seed, following the Seattle SuperSonics in 1994, the Miami Heat in 1999, and the Dallas Mavericks in 2007.

Key dates 
 June 24 – The 2010 NBA draft was held in New York City.
 July 1 – The free agency period started.
 July 12–18 – The Spurs took part in the 2010 NBA Summer League in Las Vegas.
 September 28 – The Spurs began their annual training camp at their practice facility.
 October 7 – The Spurs opened their preseason schedule with an 87–90 defeat in a road game against the Houston Rockets.
 October 28 – The Spurs won their regular season opening game at home versus the Indiana Pacers with a final score of 122–109.
 February 18–20 – The 2011 NBA All-Star Weekend took place in Los Angeles.
 February 24 – Trade deadline, 3 p.m. ET.

Summary

Offseason

Draft 

The Spurs entered the Draft with their two original picks. They used the 20th overall pick to select James Anderson, junior guard from Oklahoma State. Anderson had been named the Big 12 Player of the Year and a Second Team All-American by the Associated Press, averaging 22.3 points, 5.8 rebounds, 2.4 assists and 1.4 steals in 33 games. With the 49th pick the Spurs chose Ryan Richards, a 6-11 forward from England. The Spurs went on to sign Anderson on July 23.

Free agency 
Entering the offseason, four Spurs players were unrestricted free agents: Keith Bogans, Matt Bonner, Ian Mahinmi and Roger Mason. Additionally, Richard Jefferson exercised the early termination option on the final year of his contract and he too became an unrestricted free agent. Jefferson, however, re-signed with the Spurs to a less remunerative but longer deal shortly after. The Spurs also re-signed Bonner, which was considered a top priority by general manager R.C. Buford, while Bogans, Mahinmi and Mason signed with the Chicago Bulls, the Dallas Mavericks and the New York Knicks respectively. Following his performances as a member of their Summer League squad in July, when he led the team in scoring, the Spurs signed free agent Gary Neal. The 6-6 guard had gone undrafted in the 2007 NBA draft and spent the next three season playing in Europe.

Pre-season 
The Spurs announced their training camp roster on September 27, one day before the start of the training camp itself. The 18-man roster included the additions of Marcus Cousin, Thomas Gardner, Bobby Simmons and the Spurs 2008 draft pick James Gist. The Spurs also announced an addition to their coaching staff, as former Spurs player Jacque Vaughn was named an assistant coach. Kirk Penney joined the training camp on September 28, while Gardner was waived two days later, leaving the roster size unaffected.

Regular season

Playoffs 
After finishing the season as the #1 seed in the West, the San Antonio Spurs faced the Memphis Grizzlies in the first round of the playoffs. Little did everyone know how dangerous Memphis was in the postseason. The Spurs were forced to play game 1 without Manu Ginobili, as he sat out with a sprained elbow. As a result, Memphis won game 1, stealing home court advantage from the Spurs. The Spurs then rebounded in game 2 with a win. However, things deteriorated as the series shifted to Memphis for the Spurs, as the Grizzlies took both games 3 and 4, putting San Antonio on the brink of getting knocked out in the first round. Game 5 shifted back to San Antonio. A memorable moment for this game was when Gary Neal hit a 3-pointer as the buzzer sounded to end the game, forcing overtime, in which San Antonio got a needed win for game 5. However, game 6 went back to Memphis, and the Spurs faced their demise by being knocked in the first round in six games. This is the second time in NBA history that a #8 seed knocks off a #1 seed in a seven-game format.

Roster

Depth chart

Pre-season

Game log

|- bgcolor="#ffcccc"
| 1
| October 7
| @ Houston
| 
| DeJuan Blair (12)
| DeJuan Blair,Marcus Cousin (8)
| Tony Parker,Manu Ginóbili (5)
| Toyota Center13,035
| 0–1
|- bgcolor="#ccffcc"
| 2
| October 9
| Miami
| 
| DeJuan Blair (13)
| DeJuan Blair (7)
| Manu Ginóbili (6)
| AT&T Center18,581
| 1–1
|- bgcolor="#ccffcc"
| 3
| October 12
| @ L.A. Clippers
| 
| DeJuan Blair (21)
| Tim Duncan (13)
| Tim Duncan,Bobby Simmons,Curtis Jerrells (3)
| Palacio de los Deportes18,674
| 2–1
|- bgcolor="#ffcccc"
| 4
| October 14
| @ Cleveland
| 
| Gary Neal (10)
| DeJuan Blair (11)
| DeJuan Blair (5)
| Petersen Events Center5,121
| 2–2
|- bgcolor="#ccffcc"
| 5
| October 16
| Caja Laboral
| 
| Tony Parker (22)
| DeJuan Blair (12)
| Antonio McDyess (6)
| AT&T Center15,373
| 3–2
|- bgcolor="#ffcccc"
| 6
| October 18
| Oklahoma City
| 
| Manu Ginóbili,Tony Parker (17)
| DeJuan Blair (9)
| Tony Parker,George Hill (6)
| AT&T Center14,627
| 3–3
|- bgcolor="#ccffcc"
| 7
| October 21
| Houston
| 
| DeJuan Blair (17)
| Tim Duncan (10)
| Tim Duncan,George Hill,Garrett Temple (4)
| AT&T Center15,356
| 4–3
|-

Regular season

Standings

Record vs. opponents

Game log 

|- bgcolor="#ccffcc"
| 1
| October 27
| Indiana
| 
| Tim Duncan (23)
| Tim Duncan (12)
| Tony Parker (9)
| AT&T Center18,581
| 1–0
|- bgcolor="#ffcccc"
| 2
| October 30                   
| New Orleans
| 
| Manu Ginóbili (23)
| DeJuan Blair (11)
| George Hill (7)
| AT&T Center18,581
| 1–1
|-

|- bgcolor="#ccffcc"
| 3
| November 1
| @ L.A. Clippers
| 
| Tony Parker (19)
| Antonio McDyess (10)
| Tony Parker (9)
| Staples Center14,964
| 2–1
|- bgcolor="#ccffcc"
| 4
| November 3
| @ Phoenix
| 
| Richard Jefferson (28)
| Tim Duncan (17)
| Tony Parker (6)
| US Airways Center17,060
| 3–1
|- bgcolor="#ccffcc"
| 5
| November 6
| Houston
| 
| Manu Ginóbili (28)
| Tim Duncan (11)
| Tony Parker (14)
| AT&T Center17,740
| 4–1
|- bgcolor="#ccffcc"
| 6
| November 8
| @ Charlotte
| 
| Manu Ginóbili (26)
| Tim Duncan (10)
| Tony Parker (8)
| Time Warner Cable Arena14,152
| 5–1
|- bgcolor="#ccffcc"
| 7
| November 10
| L.A. Clippers
| 
| Manu Ginóbili, Richard Jefferson (22)
| Antonio McDyess (9)
| Tony Parker (9)
| AT&T Center17,309
| 6–1
|- bgcolor="#ccffcc"
| 8
| November 13
| Philadelphia
| 
| Tony Parker (24)
| DeJuan Blair (12)
| Tony Parker (7)
| AT&T Center17,627
| 7–1
|- bgcolor="#ccffcc"
| 9
| November 14
| @ Oklahoma City
| 
| Tony Parker (24)
| DeJuan Blair (11)
| George Hill (5)
| Oklahoma City Arena18,203
| 8–1
|- bgcolor="#ccffcc"
| 10
| November 17
| Chicago
| 
| Tony Parker (21)
| Tim Duncan (18)
| Tony Parker (7)
| AT&T Center18,581
| 9–1
|- bgcolor="#ccffcc"
| 11
| November 19
| @ Utah
| 
| Tony Parker (24)
| Tim Duncan (14)
| Tony Parker (7)
| EnergySolutions Arena19,332
| 10-1
|- bgcolor="#ccffcc"
| 12
| November 20
| Cleveland
| 
| Tony Parker (19)
| DeJuan Blair (9)
| Tony Parker (9)
| AT&T Center16,982
| 11–1
|- bgcolor="#ccffcc"
| 13
| November 22
| Orlando
| 
| Manu Ginóbili (25)
| Matt Bonner (7)
| Tony Parker (10)
| AT&T Center17,627
| 12–1
|- bgcolor="#ccffcc"
| 14
| November 24
| @ Minnesota
| 
| Manu Ginóbili (26)
| Tim Duncan (13)
| Manu Ginóbili, Tony Parker (6)
| Target Center13,117
| 13–1
|- bgcolor="#ffcccc"
| 15
| November 26
| Dallas
| 
| Manu Ginóbili (31)
| Tim Duncan (8)
| Manu Ginóbili, Tim Duncan (4)
| AT&T Center18,581
| 13–2
|- bgcolor="#ccffcc"
| 16
| November 28
| @ New Orleans
| 
| Manu Ginóbili (23)
| Tim Duncan, Manu Ginóbili, Antonio McDyess (7)
| Tony Parker (9)
| New Orleans Arena12,449
| 14–2
|- bgcolor="#ccffcc"
| 17
| November 30
| @ Golden State
| 
| Manu Ginóbili (27)
| Tim Duncan (18)
| Tim Duncan (11)
| Oracle Arena17,877
| 15–2
|-

|- bgcolor="#ffcccc"
| 18
| December 1
| @ L.A. Clippers
| 
| George Hill (17)
| Richard Jefferson (9)
| Manu Ginóbili (6)
| Staples Center16,584
| 15–3
|- bgcolor="#ccffcc"
| 19
| December 3
| Minnesota
| 
| Tim Duncan (22)
| Tim Duncan, Richard Jefferson (10)
| Tim Duncan (5)
| AT&T Center18,581
| 16–3
|- bgcolor="#ccffcc"
| 20
| December 5
| New Orleans
| 
| Tony Parker (19)
| Tim Duncan (9)
| Tony Parker (6)
| AT&T Center17,571
| 17–3
|- bgcolor="#ccffcc"
| 21
| December 8
| Golden State
| 
| Tony Parker (19)
| DeJuan Blair (13)
| Tony Parker (9)
| AT&T Center16,913
| 18–3
|- bgcolor="#ccffcc"
| 22
| December 10
| Atlanta
| 
| Manu Ginóbili, Richard Jefferson (18)
| DeJuan Blair (12)
| Tony Parker (6)
| AT&T Center17,576
|  19-3
|- bgcolor="#ccffcc"
| 23
| December 12
| Portland
| 
| George Hill (22)
| Tim Duncan (13)
| Tony Parker (6)
| AT&T Center16,743
| 20–3
|- bgcolor="#ccffcc"
| 24
| December 15
| Milwaukee
| 
| Manu Ginóbili (26)
| Tim Duncan (11)
| Tony Parker (8)
| AT&T Center17,644
| 21–3
|- bgcolor="#ccffcc"
| 25
| December 16
| @ Denver
| 
| Tim Duncan (28)
| Tim Duncan (16)
| Tony Parker (9)
| Pepsi Center16,190
| 22–3
|- bgcolor="#ccffcc"
| 26
| December 18
| Memphis
| 
| Tony Parker (37)
| Tim Duncan (10)
| Manu Ginóbili, Tony Parker (9)
| AT&T Center18,581
| 23–3
|- bgcolor="#ccffcc"
| 27
| December 20
| Phoenix
| 
| Gary Neal (22)
| Tim Duncan (15)
| Tim Duncan (6)
| AT&T Center18,581
| 24–3
|- bgcolor="#ccffcc"
| 28
| December 22
| Denver
| 
| Manu Ginóbili, Gary Neal (22)
| Tim Duncan, Tiago Splitter (9)
| Tony Parker (9)
| AT&T Center18,581
| 25–3
|- bgcolor="#ffcccc"
| 29
| December 23
| @ Orlando
| 
| Tony Parker (16)
| Matt Bonner, Tim Duncan, Richard Jefferson (6)
| Manu Ginóbili (6)
| Amway Center18,916
| 25–4
|- bgcolor="#ccffcc"
| 30
| December 26
| Washington
| 
| Manu Ginóbili (21)
| Tim Duncan, Richard Jefferson (9)
| Tony Parker (14)
| AT&T Center18,581
| 26–4
|- bgcolor="#ccffcc"
| 31
| December 28
| L.A. Lakers
| 
| Tony Parker (23)
| DeJuan Blair (15)
| Manu Ginóbili (6)
| AT&T Center18,581
| 27–4
|- bgcolor="#ccffcc"
| 32
| December 30
| @ Dallas
| 
| Gary Neal (21)
| Tim Duncan (11)
| Tony Parker (5)
| American Airlines Center20,604
| 28–4
|-

|- bgcolor="#ccffcc"
| 33
| January 1
| Oklahoma City
| 
| Tim Duncan (21)
| DeJuan Blair, Tim Duncan (9)
| Tony Parker (10)
| AT&T Center18,581
| 29–4
|- bgcolor="#ffcccc"
| 34
| January 4
| @ New York
| 
| Tony Parker (26)
| DeJuan Blair (8)
| Tony Parker (6)
| Madison Square Garden19,763
| 29–5
|- bgcolor="#ffcccc"
| 35
| January 5
| @ Boston
| 
| Manu Ginóbili (24)
| Manu Ginóbili (8)
| Tony Parker (5)
| TD Garden18,624
| 29–6
|- bgcolor="#ccffcc"
| 36
| January 7
| @ Indiana
| 
| Manu Ginóbili (25)
| Tim Duncan (15)
| Manu Ginóbili, George Hill (4)
| Conseco Fieldhouse14,157
| 30–6
|- bgcolor="#ccffcc"
| 37
| January 9
| Minnesota
| 
| Manu Ginóbili (21)
| Matt Bonner (9)
| Tim Duncan (5)
| AT&T Center18,581
| 31–6
|- bgcolor="#ccffcc"
| 38
| January 11
| @ Minnesota
| 
| Manu Ginóbili (19)
| Manu Ginóbili (9)
| Tony Parker (13)
| Target Center11,209
| 32–6
|- bgcolor="#ccffcc"
| 39
| January 12
| @ Milwaukee
| 
| Manu Ginóbili (23)
| Tim Duncan (8)
| Tony Parker (9)
| Bradley Center14,061
| 33–6
|- bgcolor="#ccffcc"
| 40
| January 14
| Dallas
| 
| Tony Parker, DeJuan Blair (18)
| DeJuan Blair (13)
| Tony Parker (6)
| AT&T Center18,581
| 34–6
|- bgcolor="#ccffcc"
| 41
| January 16
| Denver
| 
| Tony Parker (30)
| Tim Duncan (16)
| Manu Ginóbili (7)
| AT&T Center18,581
| 35–6
|- bgcolor="#ccffcc"
| 42
| January 19
| Toronto
| 
| Manu Ginóbili (23)
| Tim Duncan (12)
| Manu Ginóbili (7)
| AT&T Center18,581
| 36–6
|- bgcolor="#ccffcc"
| 43
| January 21
| New York
| 
| Tim Duncan, Tony Parker (21)
| Tim Duncan (16)
| Tony Parker (13)
| AT&T Center18,581
| 37–6
|- bgcolor="#ffcccc"
| 44
| January 22
| @ New Orleans
| 
| Tiago Splitter (11)
| DeJuan Blair, Tiago Splitter (6)
| Manu Ginóbili (6)
| New Orleans Arena18,023
| 37–7
|- bgcolor="#ccffcc"
| 45
| January 24
| @ Golden State
| 
| Manu Ginóbili (20)
| Antonio McDyess (10)
| Tony Parker (11)
| Oracle Arena18,523
| 38–7
|- bgcolor="#ccffcc"
| 46
| January 26
| @ Utah
| 
| Manu Ginóbili (26)
| DeJuan Blair (9)
| Manu Ginóbili (7)
| EnergySolutions Arena19,911
| 39–7
|- bgcolor="#ccffcc"
| 47
| January 29
| Houston
| 
| Manu Ginóbili (22)
| DeJuan Blair (12)
| George Hill, Tony Parker (5)
| AT&T Center18,581
| 40–7
|-

|- bgcolor="#ffcccc"
| 48
| February 1
| @ Portland
| 
| Manu Ginóbili (17)
| DeJuan Blair (12)
| Tony Parker (4)
| Rose Garden20,364
| 40–8
|- bgcolor="#ccffcc"
| 49
| February 3
| @ L.A. Lakers
| 
| Tony Parker (21)
| Tim Duncan, Antonio McDyess (8)
| Manu Ginóbili (8)
| Staples Center18,997
| 41–8
|- bgcolor="#ccffcc"
| 50
| February 4
| @ Sacramento
| 
| Tony Parker (25)
| DeJuan Blair (12)
| Tony Parker (7)
| ARCO Arena15,772
| 42–8
|- bgcolor="#ccffcc"
| 51
| February 8
| @ Detroit
| 
| Tony Parker (19)
| DeJuan Blair (12)
| Tony Parker (7)
| The Palace of Auburn Hills16,132
| 43–8
|- bgcolor="#ccffcc"
| 52
| February 9
| @ Toronto
| 
| DeJuan Blair (28)
| DeJuan Blair (11)
| Manu Ginóbili (9)
| Air Canada Centre15,867
| 44–8
|- bgcolor="#ffcccc"
| 53
| February 11
| @ Philadelphia
| 
| Tim Duncan (16)
| DeJuan Blair (14)
| Manu Ginóbili (6)
| Wells Fargo Center15,501
| 44–9
|- bgcolor="#ccffcc"
| 54
| February 12
| @ Washington
| 
| George Hill, Tony Parker (18)
| DeJuan Blair (12)
| Tony Parker (8)
| Verizon Center20,435
| 45–9
|- bgcolor="#ccffcc"
| 55
| February 14
| @ New Jersey
| 
| Manu Ginóbili (22)
| DeJuan Blair, Tim Duncan (11)
| Tony Parker (7)
| Prudential Center13,433
| 46–9
|- bgcolor="#ffcccc"
| 56
| February 17
| @ Chicago
| 
| Tony Parker (26)
| Tim Duncan (9)
| Tony Parker (4)
| United Center22,172
| 46–10
|- align="center"
|colspan="9" bgcolor="#bbcaff"|All-Star Break 
|- bgcolor="#ccffcc"
| 57
| February 23
| Oklahoma City
| 
| Tony Parker (20)
| Tim Duncan (10)
| Manu Ginóbili (9)
| AT&T Center18,581
| 47–10
|- bgcolor="#ccffcc"
| 58
| February 25
| New Jersey
| 
| Manu Ginóbili (26)
| George Hill, Tony Parker (7)
| Tony Parker (10)
| AT&T Center18,581
| 48–10
|- bgcolor="#ccffcc"
| 59
| February 27
| Memphis
| 
| Manu Ginóbili (35)
| Antonio McDyess (9)
| Manu Ginóbili (8)
| AT&T Center18,581
| 49–10
|-

|- bgcolor="#ffcccc"
| 60
| March 1
| @ Memphis
| 
| Gary Neal (14)
| Tim Duncan (8)
| Manu Ginóbili (7)
| FedExForum13,480
| 49–11
|- bgcolor="#ccffcc"
| 61
| March 2
| @ Cleveland
| 
| George Hill (22)
| DeJuan Blair (10)
| Tim Duncan, Manu Ginóbili (6)
| Quicken Loans Arena18,795
| 50–11
|- bgcolor="#ccffcc"
| 62
| March 4
| Miami
| 
| Manu Ginóbili (20)
| Tim Duncan (14)
| Tony Parker (8)
| AT&T Center18,581
| 51–11
|- bgcolor="#ffcccc"
| 63
| March 6
| L.A. Lakers
| 
| Gary Neal (15)
| DeJuan Blair (12)
| Gary Neal (4)
| AT&T Center18,996
| 51–12
|- bgcolor="#ccffcc"
| 64
| March 9
| Detroit
| 
| Tony Parker (23)
| Tim Duncan (12)
| Tony Parker (7)
| AT&T Center18,581
| 52–12
|- bgcolor="#ccffcc"
| 65
| March 11
| Sacramento
| 
| Tony Parker (27)
| Tim Duncan (10)
| Manu Ginóbili (7)
| AT&T Center18,712
| 53–12
|- bgcolor="#ccffcc"
| 66
| March 12
| @ Houston
| 
| Tony Parker (21)
| Antonio McDyess (12)
| Tony Parker (6)
| Toyota Center18,245
| 54–12
|- bgcolor="#ffcccc"
| 67
| March 14
| @ Miami
| 
| Tony Parker (18)
| Tim Duncan, Manu Ginóbili (6)
| Manu Ginóbili, Tony Parker (5)
| American Airlines Arena20,021
| 54–13
|- bgcolor="#ccffcc"
| 68
| March 18
| @ Dallas
| 
| Tony Parker (33)
| Tim Duncan (8)
| Manu Ginóbili (5)
| American Airlines Center20,614
| 55–13
|- bgcolor="#ccffcc"
| 69
| March 19
| Charlotte
| 
| Steve Novak (19)
| DeJuan Blair, Tiago Splitter (6)
| George Hill, Tony Parker (9)
| AT&T Center19,075
| 56–13
|- bgcolor="#ccffcc"
| 70
| March 21
| Golden State
| 
| Manu Ginóbili (28)
| Tiago Splitter (14)
| Tony Parker (15)
| AT&T Center18,443
| 57–13
|- bgcolor="#ffcccc"
| 71
| March 23
| @ Denver
| 
| Gary Neal (25)
| Antonio McDyess (12)
| Tony Parker (5)
| Pepsi Center19,155
| 57–14
|- bgcolor="#ffcccc"
| 72
| March 25
| @ Portland
| 
| Manu Ginóbili (21)
| Antonio McDyess (8)
| Manu Ginóbili (7)
| Rose Garden20,644
| 57–15
|- bgcolor="#ffcccc"
| 73
| March 27
| @ Memphis
| 
| George Hill (30)
| DeJuan Blair (6)
| Tony Parker (6)
| FedExForum17,098
| 57–16
|- bgcolor="#ffcccc"
| 74
| March 28
| Portland
| 
| George Hill (27)
| Tiago Splitter (9)
| George Hill (6)
| AT&T Center18,583
| 57–17
|- bgcolor="#ffcccc"
| 75
| March 31
| Boston
| 
| Tony Parker (23)
| Tim Duncan (13)
| Tony Parker (8)
| AT&T Center18,583
| 57–18
|-

|- bgcolor="#ffcccc"
| 76
| April 1
| @ Houston
| 
| Tony Parker (31)
| Tim Duncan (13)
| Manu Ginóbili, Tony Parker (6)
| Toyota Center18,059
| 57–19
|- bgcolor="#ccffcc"
| 77
| April 3
| Phoenix
| 
| George Hill (29)
| Matt Bonner (11)
| Tony Parker (8)
| AT&T Center18,581
| 58–19
|- bgcolor="#ccffcc"
| 78
| April 5
| @ Atlanta
| 
| Tony Parker (26)
| Matt Bonner, Tim Duncan, Antonio McDyess (6)
| Manu Ginóbili, Tony Parker (4)
| Philips Arena17,277
| 59–19
|- bgcolor="#ccffcc"
| 79
| April 6
| Sacramento
| 
| Manu Ginóbili (25)
| DeJuan Blair, Tim Duncan (8)
| Tony Parker (6)
| AT&T Center18,590
| 60–19
|- bgcolor="#ccffcc"
| 80
| April 9
| Utah
| 
| Richard Jefferson (20)
| Tiago Splitter (8)
| Tony Parker (7)
| AT&T Center18,802
| 61–19
|- bgcolor="#ffcccc"
| 81
| April 12
| @ L.A. Lakers
| 
| Gary Neal (16)
| DeJuan Blair (11)
| Chris Quinn (9)
| Staples Center18,997
| 61–20
|- bgcolor="#ffcccc"
| 82
| April 13
| @ Phoenix
| 
| Tim Duncan (17)
| Tim Duncan (12)
| Tony Parker (7)
| US Airways Center18,195
| 61–21
|-

Playoffs

Game log

|- bgcolor=ffcccc
| 1
| April 17
| Memphis
| 
| Tony Parker (20)
| Tim Duncan (13)
| Tony Parker (5)
| AT&T Center18,581
| 0–1
|- bgcolor=ccffcc
| 2
| April 20
| Memphis
| 
| Manu Ginóbili (17)
| Tim Duncan (10)
| Tony Parker (7)
| AT&T Center18,581
| 1–1
|- bgcolor=ffcccc
| 3
| April 23
| @ Memphis
| 
| Manu Ginóbili (23)
| Tim Duncan (11)
| Tim Duncan (6)
| FedExForum18,119
| 1–2
|- bgcolor=ffcccc
| 4
| April 25
| @ Memphis
| 
| Tony Parker (23)
| Tiago Splitter (9)
| Manu Ginóbili (4)
| FedExForum18,119
| 1–3
|- bgcolor=ccffcc
| 5
| April 27
| Memphis
| 
| Manu Ginóbili (33)
| Tim Duncan (12)
| Tony Parker (9)
| AT&T Center18,581
| 2–3
|- bgcolor=ffcccc
| 6
| April 29
| @ Memphis
| 
| Tony Parker (23)
| Tim Duncan (10)
| Tony Parker (4)
| FedExForum18,119
| 2–4
|-

Player statistics

Regular season

Playoffs

Awards, records and milestones

Awards

Player of the week/month 

Tony Parker was named Western Conference Player of the Week  for games played from December 13 through December 19 and again for games played March 7 through March 13

All-Star 

 Manu Ginóbili was voted as an NBA Western Conference All-Star reserve. (2nd appearance)
 Tim Duncan was voted as an NBA Western Conference All-Star reserve. (13th appearance)

Season 

 Manu Ginóbili was named to the All-NBA Third Team.
 Gary Neal was named to the All-Rookie First Team.

Records 
On November 19, when San Antonio beat the Utah Jazz to go 10–1, it marked the best start to a season in franchise history.

Milestones

Injuries and surgeries

Transactions

Trades

Free agents

Additions

Subtractions

References 

San Antonio Spurs seasons
San Antonio
San Antonio
San Antonio